Spirit in the Room is the 39th studio album by Welsh musician Tom Jones, released 21 May 2012 It was produced by Ethan Johns. The album is composed entirely of covers.

Among the songs covered on the album are Tom Waits’ "Bad as Me", Odetta’s "Hit or Miss", Vera Hall Ward’s "Travelling Shoes", Richard & Linda Thompson's "Dimming of the Day", and "Charlie Darwin" by The Low Anthem. Spirit in the Room also includes songs by Paul Simon, Leonard Cohen and Paul McCartney amongst others.

Track listing

Note: the original release only included tracks 1-10.

Personnel
 Tom Jones – vocals
 Ethan Johns – bass, e-bow, electric slide guitar, 12-string guitar, acoustic guitar, electric guitar, mixing, percussion, slide guitar, toy drums
 Richard Causon – piano, organ, harmonium
 Stella Mozgawa – brushes, drums, percussion
 Samuel Dixon – bass
 Ian Jennings – string bass

Technical
 Robin Baynton – engineer
 Dominic Monks – engineer, mixing
 Jose Gomes and Patrick Philips – assistant engineers

Charts

References

Tom Jones (singer) albums
2012 albums
Island Records albums
Albums produced by Ethan Johns
Covers albums